Teun Koopmeiners (born 28 February 1998) is a Dutch professional footballer who plays as a midfielder for  club Atalanta and the Netherlands national team.

Having represented the Netherlands at various youth levels, Koopmeiners was called up to the senior team's preliminary UEFA Nations League squad in August 2020. He was later part of their squad for the 2022 FIFA World Cup.

Club career

AZ
Koopmeiners grew up in Castricum, North Holland, and took his first steps in football as a youth player for the local club, Vitesse '22. In 2009, he joined the AZ youth academy at under-12 level. He eventually progressed through the ranks, and as part of the club's reserve team, Jong AZ, he became champion of the Dutch third division in the 2016–17 season, reaching promotion to the Eerste Divisie.

On 18 August 2017, Koopmeiners made his professional debut for Jong AZ in a 3–1 away win over FC Den Bosch. He made his first team-debut on 1 October, coming on as a substitute for Alireza Jahanbakhsh for the final 30 minutes of a 4–0 home loss to Feyenoord. At the end of the 2017–18 season, AZ ended in third place, and thereby qualified for Europa League. In his first professional season, he made 26 league appearances in which he scored one goal.

On 1 March 2020, Koopmeiners played a 70-metre pass to set up Oussama Idrissi for AZ's second goal in a 2–0 win against Ajax which put his side level on points with Ajax. During the 2019–20 AZ Alkmaar season Koopmeiners scored 16 goals in all competitions in 42 appearances, helping his side finish second in the Eredivisie on goal difference behind the Champions AFC Ajax.

He scored his first goal of the 2020–21 season against Viktoria Plzen on 26 August 2020 in the UEFA Champions League qualifier 3–1 victory. On 14 January 2021, Koopmeiners scored two goals, including an audacious backheel flick, to help his side clinch an 3–1 away victory against PSV Eindhoven.

Atalanta
On 30 August 2021, Koopmeiners signed for Serie A club Atalanta for a reported fee of €12 million. He made his debut on 11 September in the home match against Fiorentina, as a late substitute for Matteo Pessina.

On 1 September 2022, Koopmeiners scored a hat-trick in a 3–1 Serie A victory over Torino.

International career
Koopmeiners made four appearances for the Netherlands national under-17 team, as well as two appearances for the national under-18 team. As part of the under-19s, he played at the 2017 UEFA European Under-19 Championship, reaching the semi-finals and only losing to Portugal. At under-19 level, Koopmeiners made 13 appearances. After five appearances for the Netherlands Under-20 team, he made his debut for the national under-21 team on 22 March 2018 in a 4–1 loss in Doetinchem to the Belgium U21.

On 19 August 2020, Koopmeiners was called up to the senior Netherlands national team by caretaker manager Dwight Lodeweges in the preliminary squad for the UEFA Nations League fixtures against Poland and Italy. In October, he made his debut in a friendly match against Mexico.

Style of play
Koopmeiners can play as a defensive midfielder or central midfielder. He can also play as a centre-back. He is known for his leadership qualities, and captained AZ Alkmaar despite his young age.

Personal life
His younger brother Peer is also a professional footballer; Peer still plays for AZ.

Career statistics

Club

International

Netherlands score listed first, score column indicates score after each Koopmeiners goal.

References

External links
Profile at the Atalanta B.C. website
 

Living people
1998 births
Footballers from North Holland
Association football midfielders
Dutch footballers
Netherlands international footballers
Netherlands under-21 international footballers
Netherlands youth international footballers
Eredivisie players
Eerste Divisie players
Serie A players
AZ Alkmaar players
Jong AZ players
Atalanta B.C. players
UEFA Euro 2020 players
2022 FIFA World Cup players
Dutch expatriate footballers
Expatriate footballers in Italy